Romantic Defiance is a studio album by American jazz trumpeter Terence Blanchard. The album was released on May 30, 1995 via Columbia and contains eight original lyrical compositions written by Blanchard.

Critical reception
Peter Watrous of The New York Times wrote "...the composition, full of bursts of melodies and winding ribbons of notes, was often overwhelmed by long improvisations. Mr. Blanchard's group is exceptionally aware of dynamics, and during the suite he and the band managed to impart, through long quiet sections, a real sense of tranquillity." A reviewer of Billboard stated, "Leading trumpeter Terence Blanchard's newest set is a strong, searching quintet date, featuring Kenny Garrett, who makes his tenor debut." Brian Morton and Richard Cook in The Penguin Jazz Guide: The History of the Music in the 1000 Best Albums called the album "wonderful".

Track listing

Personnel
Band
Terence Blanchard – trumpet, composer, producer 
Chris Thomas – bass
Troy Davis – drums 
Edward Simon – piano
Kenny Garrett – tenor saxophone

Production
James P. Nichols – engineer 
Dr. George Producer – executive producer

Chart performance

References

External links

1995 albums
Terence Blanchard albums
Columbia Records albums